Åse may refer to:

People
 Tone Åse (born 1965), Norwegian singer

Given name
 Åse Birkrem, Norwegian handball player
 Åse Fosli, Norwegian politician for the Conservative Party
 Åse Hedstrøm, Norwegian composer based in Stockholm, Sweden
 Åse Idland, retired Norwegian biathlete
 Åse Kleveland, Swedish-Norwegian singer and politician
 Åse Klundelien, Norwegian politician for the Labour Party
 Åse Gruda Skard, Norwegian psychologist, and a pioneer in the field of the bringing up of children
 Åse Michaelsen, Norwegian politician representing the Progress Party
 Agnetha Fältskog, born Åse Agneta Fältskog, Swedish singer, songwriter, musician and actress, best known as a member of ABBA

Characters
 Åse Ludwigson, a character in the 1996 miniseries Titanic
 Åse, a character in the 1867 play Peer Gynt by Henrik Ibsen

Places
 Åse, Nordland, a village in Andøy municipality in Nordland county, Norway
 Åse Hundred, a hundred in Sweden

See also
 Asa (disambiguation)
 Åsa (disambiguation), for the Swedish version of the name